Gabasheane Masupha (26 December 1903 - 28 January 1941) was the Regent paramount chief of Basotho (modern Lesotho) from 1940 to 1941. Principal Chief of Ha-'Mamathe, Teya-teyaneng, Thupa-kubu and Jorotane. Died 1949; spouse  'Mamathe Masupha (nee. Nthati Lebona). Issues 'Mankhabe Masupha  (daughter), Mathe Masupha  (daughter), Masupha Masupha  (son), Koali Masupha  (son), 'Mabatho Masupha  (daughter), Sempe Masupha (son), Michele Masupha  (son).

References

1903 births
1941 deaths
House of Moshesh
Basutoland in World War II
Basutoland people